Lawrence William Cramer (December 26, 1897 – 1978) was the second civilian Governor of the United States Virgin Islands.

Cramer was born in New Orleans, Louisiana. He graduated from the University of Wisconsin–Madison and obtained a master's degree from Columbia University. He then spent two years in the United States Army during World War I and was wounded in battle. After the war, he returned as a professor of government at Columbia University and wrote a book about the diplomatic background of the war.

Cramer was Lieutenant Governor under Paul Martin Pearson since 1931. Both he and Pearson were subpoenaed to appear in Washington, D.C. before the Senate regarding a scandal / political dispute that ultimately resulted in the forced resignation of Pearson and the appointment of Cramer as full governor on August 21, 1935. After his appointment, the Senate hearings continued and Robert Herrick was made acting-Governor.

Before Cramer was even installed, he had been tainted by his predecessor's reputation. The Islands' Colonial Council voted on July 29, 1935, to petition President Franklin D. Roosevelt to bring the Islands back under the control of the United States Navy, as it had been prior to 1931.

After his inauguration, however, Cramer made some positive moves which quelled fears. First, he was sworn in by a native judge and not a mainland one. He announced stepped-up rum exporting plans and petitioned the Department of the Interior for increased home rule for the territory. He also petitioned for universal suffrage. These moves were successful and the moves to oust Cramer ceased.

However, his difficulties resurfaced in 1937 as the Legislature of the United States Virgin Islands met for the first time and refused to consider eight of the nine bills he asked them to vote on. Cramer continued to have difficulties with the Assembly over tax law and other matters.

He resigned as governor in December, 1941. Cramer later served as executive secretary of the Committee on Fair Employment Practice during World War II.

Cramer's Park, a popular beach on St. Croix, U.S. Virgin Islands is named after him.

See also

Notes

References
ISLANDS GET NEW RULER. Los Angeles Times. Los Angeles, Calif.: Jul 24, 1935. pg. 13, 1 pgs
CRAMER A LIBERAL; WAS AN EDUCATOR. Special to THE NEW YORK TIMES. New York Times. New York, N.Y.: Jul 24, 1935. pg. 11, 1 pgs
Island Groups Oppose Cramer. Special Cable to THE NEW YORK TIMES. New York Times. New York, N.Y.: Jul 25, 1935. pg. 15, 1 pgs
REQUESTS RULE BY NAVY. New York Times. New York, N.Y.: Jul 30, 1935. pg. 6, 1 pgs
VIRGIN ISLANDS WRITE A HOME RULE BILL. HARWOOD HULL. New York Times. New York, N.Y.: Feb 2, 1936. pg. E12, 1 pgs
CRAMER REBUFFED IN VIRGIN ISLANDS. Special Cable to THE NEW YORK TIMES. New York Times. New York, N.Y.: Nov 24, 1937. pg. 15, 1 pgs
CRAMER RESIGNS VIRGIN ISLAND POST. Times Wide World. New York Times. New York, N.Y.: Dec 3, 1940. pg. 25, 1 pgs

1897 births
1978 deaths
Politicians from New Orleans
Columbia University alumni
University of Wisconsin–Madison alumni
Governors of the United States Virgin Islands
United States Army personnel of World War I
United States Army soldiers